Taipa-Mangonui or Taipa Bay-Mangonui is a string of small resort settlements – Taipa, Cable Bay, Coopers Beach, and Mangōnui – that lie along the coast of Doubtless Bay and are so close together that they have run together to form one larger settlement.

The miniature conurbation lies 150 kilometres by road northwest of Whangārei (and 100 kilometres as the crow flies), 20 kilometres northeast of Kaitaia, and nearly 100 kilometres southeast of the northernmost tip of the North Island. It is the northernmost centre in New Zealand with a population of more than 1000.

The New Zealand Ministry for Culture and Heritage gives a translation of "great shark" for Mangōnui.

Demographics

Taumarumaru had a population of 2,193 at the 2018 New Zealand census, an increase of 381 people (21.0%) since the 2013 census, and an increase of 513 people (30.5%) since the 2006 census. There were 855 households, comprising 1,053 males and 1,137 females, giving a sex ratio of 0.93 males per female. The median age was 53.5 years (compared with 37.4 years nationally), with 357 people (16.3%) aged under 15 years, 243 (11.1%) aged 15 to 29, 897 (40.9%) aged 30 to 64, and 693 (31.6%) aged 65 or older.

Ethnicities were 78.7% European/Pākehā, 30.6% Māori, 4.5% Pacific peoples, 3.0% Asian, and 1.8% other ethnicities. People may identify with more than one ethnicity.

The percentage of people born overseas was 17.6, compared with 27.1% nationally.

Of those people who chose to answer the census's question about religious affiliation, 46.8% had no religion, 39.4% were Christian, 2.1% had Māori religious beliefs, 0.5% were Hindu, 0.7% were Buddhist and 1.8% had other religions.

Of those at least 15 years old, 300 (16.3%) people had a bachelor or higher degree, and 396 (21.6%) people had no formal qualifications. The median income was $22,800, compared with $31,800 nationally. 174 people (9.5%) earned over $70,000 compared to 17.2% nationally. The employment status of those at least 15 was that 573 (31.2%) people were employed full-time, 276 (15.0%) were part-time, and 90 (4.9%) were unemployed.

History

Before European arrival
According to some Māori legends, the great Polynesian explorer and navigator Kupe sailed from Hawaiki in his canoe named Matahourua and landed at Taipa Bay. Others believe that he landed in the Hokianga Harbour around AD 900.

Centuries after Kupe’s landing, the chiefs Te Parata and Tu moana, descendants of Kupe, were said to have brought the ancestors of the Ngāti Kahu tribe to the Mangonui area around AD 1350, returning on the same canoe. Legend has it that they found insufficient fresh water at Otengi Bay and travelled up to the mouth of the Taipa River to land. There they settled and married into the local tribes.

Another canoe led by Moehuri is said to have been guided by a large shark into the Mangonui Harbour to a landing spot opposite the old post office. He made the shark tapu and called the harbour Mangonui, meaning 'big shark' in the Māori language. In the 19th century, the spelling Mongonui was more common, and the Mongonui electorate filled one seat in Parliament between 1861 and 1881. Moehuri settled in Mangonui and married into the local people – remnants of the Ngāti Awa and branch tribes of the Ngāti Whātua. Pā were located all around the area, including one at Mill Bay, called Rangikapiti by Moehuri.

Taumarumaru pā was located on the headland between Mangonui and Coopers Beach while at the western end of Coopers Beach was Ohumuhumu pā, surrounded at one time by a large village.

Since European arrival
In 1769 James Cook sailed past and noted that it was "doubtless a bay ...", hence the modern name of Doubtless Bay. Eight days later the first Europeans to land were Jean-François de Surville and his crew aboard Saint Jean-Baptiste. They landed at what he named Lauriston Bay to get fresh vegetables to combat scurvy. Around twenty years later, whalers and sealers from all over the western world arrived, and called the area Coopers Beach – thought to have come from the coopers on the whaleships.

The first European settler is considered to be James David Berghan from Ireland, who arrived in Mangonui in 1831. By the later half of the 19th century, flax and timber industries were flourishing in the area. Other settlers developed farms and businesses in the area while some married into the native population. The dynamic mix of settlers coming from various parts of Europe and the Maori population provided Mangonui with a rich heritage.

When Hōne Heke destroyed Kororareka (Russell), the evacuation saw 40 to 50 ships in the Mangonui Harbour. The town assumed new importance and was considered the country’s second capital. The last whaling ship visited Mangonui in 1885.

Marae

Mangonui has three marae:
 Aputerewa Marae and Te Puna Roimata meeting house, a meeting place of the Ngāti Kahu hapū of Ngāti Takiora / Ngāi Tauurutakaware.
 Kēnana Marae and Te Ranginui meeting house, a meeting place of the Ngāti Kahu hapū of Matarahurahu.
 Taemaro marae, a meeting place of the Ngāti Kahu ki Whangaroa hapū of Ngāti Roha and Ngāti Rua, and the Ngāpuhi / Ngāti Kahu ki Whaingaroa hapū of Ngāti Aukiwa.

The Taipa area has three Ngāti Kahu marae:
 Karepori Marae and meeting house, a meeting place of the hapū of Matakairiri / Pikaahu.
 Ko Te Ahua Marae and meeting house is a meeting place of the hapū of Ngāti Te Rūrunga / Te Paatu.
 Parapara Marae and Te Manawa o Ngāti Tara meeting house is a meeting place of the hapū of Ngāti Tara ki Parapara.

Education

Taipa Area School is a composite (years 1–15) school with a roll of  students.

Mangonui School is a contributing primary (years 1–6) school with a roll of  students. The school opened in 1858, and one of the original buildings is still in use as the school library.

Both schools are coeducational. Rolls are as of

Gallery

Notes

External links

 Doubtless Bay
Doubtless Bay at Kaitaia Online

Populated places in the Northland Region
Far North District